"One Sweet Day" is a song recorded by American singer-songwriter Mariah Carey and vocal group Boyz II Men. The artists co-wrote the song with Walter Afanasieff, who co-produced it with Carey. Lyrically, the song speaks about the death of a loved one, how the protagonist took their presence for granted and misses them, and finally about seeing the person in heaven. Both Carey and Boyz II Men wrote the song about specific people in their lives, being inspired by sufferers of the AIDS epidemic, which was globally prevalent at the time.

"One Sweet Day" received universal acclaim from music critics, many of whom praised its lyrical content and vocals while calling it a standout track on Daydream. It was ranked first in Rolling Stones reader's poll for the Best Collaboration of All Time. The song spent 16 weeks atop the Billboard Hot 100 in the United States, becoming the longest-running number-one song in the chart's history at the time, a record held for 23 years. The song ranked first on Billboard's Hot 100 decade-end chart. Subsequently, the publication ranked it as the ninth best charting single of the 1990s with post-90s sales and streaming figures incorporated. Internationally, the song topped the charts in Canada and New Zealand; and reached the top-ten in Australia, Belgium, Denmark, France, Ireland, the Netherlands, Norway, Panama, Sweden and the United Kingdom.

Carey performed "One Sweet Day" live alongside Boyz II Men at the 38th Grammy Awards ceremony, held on February 26, 1996. Additionally, the song was performed at Princess Diana's memorial service in September 1997. "One Sweet Day" was part of the set list on several of Carey's succeeding tours, making its debut during the album's accompanying set of concerts, the Daydream World Tour. It is featured on her compilation albums, #1's (1998), Greatest Hits (2001), The Ballads (2008), and #1 to Infinity (2015).

The music video for "One Sweet Day" was filmed in February 1995, and features snippets of Carey and Boyz II Men in and around the studio, and recording the song. The busy schedule of both acts did not allow time to shoot a proper video. Carey later said that she was content a real music video was never filmed, fearing that no video could truly capture the song's strong lyrical message. Critics felt the video choice was wise, and agreed that the simple concept paid homage to the song's selfless message.

Background 

"One Sweet Day" was a song that Carey wrote with the R&B group Boyz II Men. After Carey's friend and past collaborator David Cole (of C&C Music Factory) died, she began writing and developing a song that would pay homage to him and all the friends and family her fans had lost along life's journey. Carey had the idea and chorus composed, and after meeting with Boyz II Men, they realized they too had a similar idea in development. Together, using Carey's chorus and idea, as well as the melody they had produced, they wrote and composed the song. The song was produced by Carey and Afanasieff, who built on the song's melody and added various grooves and beats. Carey expressed how the song was "meant to be" and how all the pieces fit into place:
I wrote the initial idea for 'One Sweet Day' with Walter, and I had the chorus...and I stopped and said, 'I really wanna do this with Boyz II Men,' because...obviously I'm a big fan of theirs and I just thought that the work was crying out for them, the vocals that they do, so I put it away and said, 'Who knows if this could ever happen, but I just don't wanna finish this song because I want it to be our song if we ever do it together. [The] whole idea of when you lose people that are close to you, it changes your life and changes your perspective. When they came into the studio, I played them the idea for the song and when [it] was finished, they looked at each other, a bit stunned, and told me that Nathan "Nate" Morris had written a song for his road manager who had passed away. It had basically the same lyrics and fitted over the same chord changes. It was really, really weird, we finished the song right then and there. We were all kinda flipped about it ourselves. Fate had a lot to do with that. I know some people won't believe it, but we wouldn't make up such a crazy story.

After they began working on the song, Carey began to incorporate other lyrics into the chorus, trying to make the song relatable to the AIDS epidemic that was in full force in the mid-1990s. Additionally, Mariah's sister Alison Carey had been diagnosed with HIV in 1988 when she was 27, an event that ruined their relationship and tore them apart. Carey has stated that she wrote the song hoping that all her fans that have lost someone could relate to "One Sweet Day" and maybe help ease the pain of the loss. Carey described the song as "[the] whole idea of when you lose people that are close to you, it changes your life and changes our perspective."

Composition 

"One Sweet Day" is a "big" R&B ballad. It incorporates organ instrumentation and different contemporary grooves and beats into its primary arrangement, adding percussion and synthesizers as well, while incorporating "flourishes and harmonies" from both Carey and Boyz II Men. The song is set in the time signature common time and moves at a slow tempo of 64 beats per minute. It is written in the key of A major and features a basic chord progression of A–Dmaj9–A–Dmaj9–Gadd9, while the basic melodic line spans roughly an octave and a half from E4 to A5; the piano in the piece ranges from D2 to A5. The song contains choral lyrics written by Carey, who also arranged and co-produced the song alongside Walter Afanasieff. Author Chris Nickson complimented the song's instrumentation and arrangement, calling its use of synthesizers "wise" and "efficient." Additionally, he claimed Afanasieff's production and Carey's vocal and production arrangement helped the song's vocals and lyrical content flow together. The song finishes with the last chorus and coda in the key of B major.

Reception and accolades 
"One Sweet Day" has been met with universal acclaim from contemporary music critics. AllMusic's Stephen Thomas Erlewine praised the song for its craft and writing, commenting that "[in] "One Sweet Day," a duet with Boyz II Men, Carey appeals to both audiences equally because of the sheer amount of craft and hard work she puts into her albums. Steve Baltin from Cash Box wrote, "This single could be thrown at the bottom of the 99 cents bin, buried under the Partridge Family and Starlite Vocal Band, and it would still find its way into the hands of fans. This is as big a guaranteed hit as anything that’s come out in some time". He added, "You will never find a surer bet than whether this song will make number one." James Masterton for Dotmusic demed it as "a saccharine piece of American soul slush." Ken Tucker from Entertainment Weekly felt the song truly highlighted the album, "[One Sweet Day] radiates a breezy sexiness that Carey, for all the brazen hussiness of her public persona, rarely permits herself to reveal in song. In 2018, the magazine noted, "Goosebumps, every time. Carey's heavenly vocals, combined with the song's universal message and the sweet harmonies of Boyz II Men." Stephen Holden from The New York Times shared similar sentiments and wrote "On 'One Sweet Day,' the singer joins forces with Boyz II Men, those masters of pleading post-doo-wop vocal harmonies, for a tender eulogy that suggests that the singers have been personally touched by the AIDS crisis." A reviewer from People magazine felt the song was a "stand-out track" and called Carey's vocal performance "bravura belting."

"One Sweet Day" won many prestigious awards throughout 1996. At the Blockbuster Entertainment Awards, the song won the award for "Favorite Adult Contemporary Single Female 'One Sweet Day'". "One Sweet Day" also won the award for "Song of the Year" at the BMI Awards and a "Special Award for 16 weeks at #1" at the Billboard Music Awards. Together, Daydream and "One Sweet Day" were nominated for six Grammy Awards at the 38th annual ceremony, however, to Carey's surprise, also to the surprise of many critics, they lost all of the nominations. In a readers' poll conducted by Rolling Stone, the song was ranked first for the category of the Best Collaboration of All Time.

|-
|style="text-align:center;" rowspan="7"|1996
|rowspan="2"|Billboard Music Awards
|Top Hot 100 Singles
| style="text-align:center; background:#fdd;"|Nominated
|-
|Special Award – 16 weeks at number one
| style="text-align:center; background:#9f9;"|Won
|-
|Blockbuster Entertainment Awards
|Single Favorite Adult Contemporary Female Singer
| style="text-align:center; background:#9f9;"|Won
|-
|rowspan="2"|Grammy Awards
|Best Pop Collaboration with Vocals
| style="text-align:center; background:#fdd;"|Nominated
|-
|Record of the Year
| style="text-align:center; background:#fdd;"|Nominated
|-
|MTV Video Music Awards
|Best R&B Video
| style="text-align:center; background:#fdd;"|Nominated
|-
|NAACP Image Awards
|Best Live performance at Madison Square
| style="text-align:center; background:#fdd;"|Nominated
|-
|rowspan="3" style="text-align:center;"|1997
|ASCAP Awards
|Compositor de Rhythm & Soul
| style="text-align:center; background:#9f9;"|Won
|-
|rowspan="2"|BMI Pop Music Awards
|Best Pop Composer
| style="text-align:center; background:#9f9;"|Won
|-
|Song of the Year
| style="text-align:center; background:#9f9;"|Won
|}

Chart performance 
"One Sweet Day" debuted at number one on the US Billboard Hot 100 chart dated December 2, 1995, with sales of 204,000 units. Columbia distributed free copies to stores, where it was sold for as low as 49 cents. "One Sweet Day" became the fourth song to debut at number one after Michael Jackson's "You Are Not Alone", Carey's own "Fantasy", and Whitney Houston's "Exhale (Shoop Shoop)". The song remained at the peak for a record-breaking 16 consecutive weeks, from December 2, 1995, to March 16, 1996. It remained the only song to stay at number one on the chart for 16 weeks until 2017, when the record was tied by Luis Fonsi and Daddy Yankee's "Despacito", featuring Justin Bieber. The record would remain until Lil Nas X's "Old Town Road", featuring Billy Ray Cyrus, broke the record in 2019, spending nineteen weeks atop the Billboard Hot 100. It still remains as the only number one debut to spend sixteen consecutive weeks at number one. 

Boyz II Men had previously held this record twice, with "End of the Road" (1992) spending 13 weeks at the top and "I'll Make Love to You" (1994) spending 14. The former song shares this record with Brandy and Monica's "The Boy Is Mine", and the latter song shared its record with Whitney Houston's "I Will Always Love You". Carey's 2005 song "We Belong Together", The Black Eyed Peas's 2009 "I Gotta Feeling" and Mark Ronson's 2014 track, "Uptown Funk", managed to stay at number one for 14 weeks as well. Being the fourth single in history to debut at number one on the Billboard Hot 100, "One Sweet Day" also made Boyz II Men the first group to have a single debut at number one.

"One Sweet Day" unseated "Exhale (Shoop Shoop)" by Whitney Houston at number one on the Billboard Hot 100, and was knocked off by Celine Dion's "Because You Loved Me". With the single's debut at number one, it made Carey the first artist to have more than one number-one debut, and one of the four artists ever to have two consecutive singles debut at the top of the chart, along with Britney Spears, with "3" (2009) and "Hold It Against Me" (2011), and Drake, with "God's Plan" (2018) and "Nice for What" (2018) and Ariana Grande, with "Thank U, Next" (2018) and "7 Rings" (2019). "One Sweet Day" was the third best-selling single of 1995 in the US, with sales of over 1,300,000, with the second best-selling single being Carey's "Fantasy". The song spent 26 weeks in the top 40, was certified double platinum by the Recording Industry Association of America (RIAA) and was ranked number nine on Billboards Hot 100-decade retrospective.

Outside the U.S., "One Sweet Day" was not as successful but did manage to reach the top-ten in over 13 countries and topped the charts in Canada and New Zealand, where it was certified platinum. In Canada, the song debuted on the RPM Singles Chart at number 89 on the RPM issue dated December 4, 1995, and reached the top of the chart on January 22, 1996. It was present on the chart for a total of 24 weeks, and ranked 12th on the RPM Year-end chart for 1996. It reached the top-two in Australia (platinum) and the Netherlands; the top-five in France (silver) and Ireland and the top-ten in Belgium, Norway (platinum), Sweden and the United Kingdom (gold). In the UK, it is one of Carey's best-selling singles, with estimated sales of over 400,000.

Music video 
The song's accompanying music video was directed by Larry Jordan. When Carey and Boyz II Men got together to record "One Sweet Day", they did not have enough time to re-unite and film a video. Instead, a filming crew was present during the song's recording, and filmed bits of Carey and Boyz recording the song. Walter Afanasieff later told Fred Bronson that shooting the video was "crazy", stating, "They had film crews and video guys, while I'm at the board trying to produce. And these guys were running around having a ball, because Mariah and them are laughing and screaming and they're being interviewed. And I'm tapping people on the shoulder. 'We've got to get to the microphone!' They're gone in a couple of hours, so I recorded everything they did, praying that it was enough." After the song's release, Carey expressed her contentment with the video, that she was happy a real music video was never filmed, fearing that no video could truly capture the song's "precious message." Critics agreed, feeling that the song was a perfect match for the video and its message. Aside from the recording sessions, the video also shared bits of Carey and Boyz bonding and sharing their ideas in the studio, where Carey felt they "bonded." On August 13, 2020, the music video of "One Sweet Day" reached 200 million views on YouTube.

Live performances 

"One Sweet Day" was performed at the 38th Annual Grammy Awards, held on February 28, 1996. During the performance, Carey wore a long black dress and matching sleeveless blouse, while the group wore white jackets and black pants. After the song's bridge, a choir of male and female vocalists took place on the rafters placed over the stage, all wearing white gowns. The song was also performed at the memorial service for Princess Diana in September 1997, where other performers included Elton John. During the service and song recital, Carey wore a conservative long black sheer gown, with long golden curls. Boyz II Men all wore similar matching dark suit and garments. The song became part of Carey's BET Christmas special in 2001, where she sang the song alongside Boyz II Men. During the special, Carey wore a red gown in honor of the show's holiday theme, and featured a long golden hairstyle. One of the male vocalists had already been switched, as one of the group members had already resigned.

Aside from live television appearances, the song was performed on many of Carey's tours. "One Sweet Day" was performed at every show on her Daydream World Tour (1996), where Boyz II Men were featured on a large projection screen. The footage was taken from Carey's filmed concert at Madison Square Garden in late 1995, and was played in sync with Carey's verses. A similar concept was used for her Butterfly World Tour (1998), with the addition of several live back up vocalists joining on stage. Additionally, the song was performed on select dates on her The Adventures of Mimi tour (2006). During the tour's filmed show in Anaheim California, the group joined Carey live on stage and performed the song together. For the segment of the show, Carey wore a long turquoise gown, with several slits and cuts fashioned into the sides. During the Angels Advocate Tour in 2010, Carey performed a snippet of the song in Singapore, with Trey Lorenz filling in for the group's verses.

Carey also performed the song as a part of her 2015 Las Vegas residency, Mariah Carey Number 1's, with Lorenz reprising his role as well as Daniel Moore. She also performed the song as a part of her 2018–20 Las Vegas residency, The Butterfly Returns alongside Lorenz and Moore.

It was also performed on selected dates of her 2019 Caution World Tour.

Cover versions 
"One Sweet Day" was performed by the seven finalists on the seventh season of American Idol. The performance was taped due to the "Mariah Carey" themed week, where all the competitors sang songs from Carey's repertoire. The song was additionally sung on the fifth season of the UK TV show The X Factor, by the British boy-band JLS. Their performance received praise from all four judges, who commented how it was an "impossibly hard song to sing" because it was a "Mariah song." The song was also performed by John Adeleye during the seventh season The X Factor. The theme of the night was "#1 songs." Shannon Magrane performed the song on the eleventh season of American Idol the week the contestants performed songs from their birth years. Andy Williams released a version in 2007 on his album, I Don't Remember Ever Growing Up.

Track listing and formats 

 Worldwide Cassette CD single
 "One Sweet Day" (Album Version) – 4:41
 "One Sweet Day" (Live Version form Fantasy: Mariah Carey at Madison Square Garden) – 5:08

 Japanese CD maxi-single
 "One Sweet Day" (Album Version) – 4:42
 "One Sweet Day" (Live Version from Fantasy: Mariah Carey at Madison Square Garden) – 5:10
 "Open Arms" – 3:30

 UK CD maxi-single #1
 "One Sweet Day" (Album Version) – 4:41
 "One Sweet Day" (Sweet A Cappella) – 4:52
 "One Sweet Day" (A Cappella) – 4:48
 "One Sweet Day" (Chucky's Remix) – 4:51
 "One Sweet Day" (Live Version from Fantasy: Mariah Carey at Madison Square Garden) – 5:08

 UK CD maxi-single #2
 "One Sweet Day" (Album Version) – 4:44
 "Fantasy" (Def Drums Mix) – 4:01
 "Joy to the World" (Celebration Mix) – 7:58
 "Joy to the World" (Club Mix) – 7:35

 US CD maxi-single
 "One Sweet Day" (Album Version) – 4:41
 "One Sweet Day" (Sweet A Cappella) – 4:52
 "One Sweet Day" (A Cappella) – 4:48
 "One Sweet Day" (Chucky's Remix) – 4:51
 "One Sweet Day" (Live Version) – 5:08
 "Fantasy" (Def Drums Mix) – 4:00

 One Sweet Day EP
 "One Sweet Day" (Chucky's Remix) – 4:51
 "One Sweet Day" (Sweet A Cappella) – 4:52
 "One Sweet Day" (A Cappella) – 4:49
 "One Sweet Day" (Live at Madison Square Garden - October 1995) – 5:09

Credits and personnel 
Credits adapted from the Daydream liner notes.
 Mariah Carey – co-production, songwriting (music and lyrics), vocals
 Walter Afanasieff – co-production, songwriting (music)
 Nathan Morris – songwriting (lyrics), vocals
 Wanya Morris – songwriting (lyrics), vocals
 Shawn Stockman – songwriting (lyrics), vocals
 Michael McCary – songwriting (lyrics), vocals

Charts

Weekly charts

Year-end charts

Decade-end charts

All-time charts

Certifications and sales

Release history

See also 
 List of Billboard Hot 100 chart achievements and milestones
 List of Billboard Hot 100 number-one singles of 1995
 List of Billboard Hot 100 number-one singles of 1996
 List of Hot Adult Contemporary number ones of 1995 and 1996 (U.S.)

Notes

References

Further reading

External links 
 

1990s ballads
1995 singles
Songs written by Mariah Carey
Songs written by Walter Afanasieff
Boyz II Men songs
Mariah Carey songs
Song recordings produced by Walter Afanasieff
Number-one singles in New Zealand
Billboard Hot 100 number-one singles
RPM Top Singles number-one singles
Commemoration songs
Contemporary R&B ballads
Songs written by Nathan Morris
1995 songs
Columbia Records singles
Songs written by Wanya Morris
Sony Music singles
Songs written by Shawn Stockman
Vocal collaborations